Browell is a surname. Notable people with the surname include:

George Browell (1884–1951), English footballer
John Browell (1917–1997), British radio producer
Tommy Browell (1892–1955), English footballer
William Browell (1759–1831), Royal Navy captain

See also
Bowell